Sibel Kolçak (born January 3, 1990) is a Turkish female FIFA-listed football referee. She is a teacher from profession and lives in Zonguldak, Turkey.

Early years
Sibel Kolçak was born in Zonguldak, Turkey on January 3, 1990. She studied Sports Administration at Sakarya University, and returned after graduation to her hometown Zonguldak.

Referee career

Domestic
She began her referee career in 2007 in her hometown, and officially debuted as an assistant referee debuting on March 1, 2008. She officiated her first match in the capacity of a referee on November 7, 2009, at a match of the Coca-Cola Academy U-14 League. Kolçak's first referee role in a Women*s Regional League match took place on January 8, 2011. In 2013, she was appointed referee in the men*s A2 League and Women's Second League, and finally on December 22, 2013, she was promoted to officiate a Women's First League match.

As of end 205, Kolçak was in charge of various referee roles in 76 games at different domestic leagues.

International
In November 2015, Kolçak was nominated by the Turkish Football Federation a FIFA listed official for international matches in 2016.

References

External links 
 

1990 births
Living people
Sportspeople from Zonguldak
Sakarya University alumni
Turkish schoolteachers
Turkish football referees
Turkish women referees and umpires
Women association football referees